Froggy Ball is a character from Kalle Stropp och Grodan Boll which is a series of Swedish books, radio shows and movies created by Thomas Funck. He first appeared in a radio show in 1954. The character disappeared around the early 1960s, but made a comeback in 1971 in his second radio show named "Veckans tisdag" which is Swedish for "Weekly Tuesday".

Froggy Ball appeared in comic books from 1955-1960 which were drawn by Nils Egerbrandt.

Movies
 Kalle Stropp, Grodan Boll och deras vänner (Kalle Stropp, Grodan Boll och deras vänner) (1956) 
 Kalle Stropp och Grodan Boll räddar Hönan (Kalle Stropp och Grodan Boll räddar Hönan) (1987) 
 Charlie Strapp and Froggy Ball Flying High (Kalle Stropp och Grodan Boll på svindlande äventyr) (1991)

References

External links
Kalle Stropp och Grodan Boll at LIBRIS

Swedish radio programs
Swedish children's radio programs
1954 radio programme debuts
Literary characters introduced in 1954
Fictional Swedish people
Fictional frogs
Radio characters introduced in 1954
Comics based on radio series
Male characters in radio
Male characters in literature